Vuilleminia is a genus of corticioid fungi in the family Vuilleminiaceae. It is named after the French mycologist Paul Vuillemin. According to a 2008 estimate, the genus contains 10 species which collectively have a widespread distribution.

Species
Vuilleminia alni
Vuilleminia comedens
Vuilleminia corticola
Vuilleminia coryli
Vuilleminia cystidiata
Vuilleminia macrospora
Vuilleminia maculata
Vuilleminia megalospora
Vuilleminia obducens
Vuilleminia pseudocystidiata
Vuilleminia subglobispora

References

Corticiales
Agaricomycetes genera
Taxa named by René Maire